The Hezbollah–Israel conflict is part of the Israeli–Lebanese conflict as well as the Iran–Israel proxy conflict.
South Lebanon conflict (1985–2000), in which Hezbollah was the primary force opposing Israel and the South Lebanon Army
2000–2006 Shebaa Farms conflict, a low-level border conflict between Hezbollah and Israel
2006 Lebanon War, a military conflict between Hezbollah and Israel
January 2015 Shebaa Farms incident between Hezbollah and Israel
Iran–Israel conflict during the Syrian civil war

See also
Israeli–Lebanese conflict
Lebanese Civil War
List of rocket attacks from Lebanon on Israel
Syrian civil war

 
Israeli–Lebanese conflict
Iran–Israel proxy conflict
Wars involving Hezbollah
Wars involving Israel